Itata is a genus of spiders in the jumping spider family, Salticidae.

Name
The genus name is derived from the Itata River in southern Chile.

Species
 Itata completa (Banks, 1929) – Panama
 Itata isabellina (Taczanowski, 1878) – Peru
 Itata partita Mello-Leitão, 1930 – Brazil
 Itata tipuloides Simon, 1901 – Peru, Bolivia, Brazil
 Itata vadia Peckham & Peckham, 1894 – Colombia

References
  (2009): The world spider catalog, version 9.5. American Museum of Natural History.

External links
 Awesome Spiders: Photograph of live Itata species from Barro Colorado Island and Itata completa
 Salticidae.org: Photographs of in vitro Itata species from Brazil

Salticidae
Spiders of South America
Salticidae genera